Glen Davies (born 20 February 1976) is a footballer who played in the Football League for Hartlepool United.

Davies finished his career as a player-coach at Whitehawk.

References

1976 births
Living people
Footballers from Brighton
English footballers
Association football defenders
Burnley F.C. players
Hartlepool United F.C. players
Worthing F.C. players
Saltdean United F.C. players
Burgess Hill Town F.C. players
Ringmer F.C. players
Withdean 2000 F.C. players
Whitehawk F.C. players
English Football League players